La Chamade (Heartbeat) is a 1968 French romantic drama film written and directed by Alain Cavalier and starring Catherine Deneuve and Michel Piccoli.

Plot
Based on the 1965 novel La Chamade by Françoise Sagan, the film is about a beautiful woman who is mistress to Charles, a rich, good-hearted businessman who provides for all her material needs, but for whom she has no true love. When she meets a charming young man her own age, Antoine, she falls in love. He finds her a menial job in a publishing firm, but she can not or will not hold it down. Soon she becomes pregnant with his child. But Charles helps her through her crisis by funding her abortion – against the wishes of Antoine, who nevertheless accepts, even though he planned on moving out of his bachelor flat, the three of them into a soulless concrete block, money being short. In the aftermath, her feelings for the younger Antoine fade. Eventually, she returns to the good-hearted businessman who has patiently waited for her.

Cast
Catherine Deneuve as Lucile
Michel Piccoli as Charles
 as Antoine
Amidou as Etienne
Philippine Pascal as Claire
Jacques Sereys as Johnny
Irène Tunc as Diane
Jean-Pierre Castaldi

Production
La Chamade was filmed on location in Paris and Nice.

Filming took place in April 1968 and was interrupted by riots in Paris.

Reception
Upon its theatrical release, La Chamade received generally positive reviews. In his review in The New York Times, Vincent Canby wrote, "Cavalier may have created a practically perfect screen equivalent of the novelist's prose style." In addition to praising the performances by Deneuve and Piccoli, Canby writes:

References

External links

French romantic drama films
1960s French-language films
1968 romantic drama films
Films directed by Alain Cavalier
Films based on French novels
Films based on works by Françoise Sagan
1960s French films